Edmund Spencer (18 June 1876 – 7 January 1936) was an English chess player, Chess Olympiad team bronze medal winner (1927).

Biography
Since 1900 Edmund Spencer was Manchester's chess club member. He participated in the British Chess Championship four times: 1924, 1925, 1928, 1931. 
In this tournament he achieved the best results in 1925, when won 3rd place behind Henry Ernest Atkins and Frederick Yates, and in 1931, when he ranked in 4th place. In 1924, in Weston, Edmund Spencer ranked 4th in the International Chess tournament, won by Max Euwe.

Edmund Spencer played for England in the Chess Olympiad:
 In 1927, at reserve board in the 1st Chess Olympiad in London (+2, =3, -1) and won team bronze medal.

He was the secretary and cashier of the Northern Counties Chess Union of England. After Spencer's death, the Northern Counties Chess Union Boys' Championship main prize was named after him Edmund Spencer Trophy.

References

External links

Spensers Edmund Spencer chess games at 365chess.com

1876 births
1936 deaths
Sportspeople from Oxford
English chess players
Chess Olympiad competitors